The Panjiayu massacre was a massacre conducted by the Imperial Japanese Army on January 25, 1941 in Panjiayu, Hebei, China. An estimated 1,298 of the 1,700 people living in Panjiayu were murdered. This tragedy was an example of the Three Alls Policy by the Japanese army in the Second Sino-Japanese War. The Chinese government built a memorial hall in that village in 1998.

This massacre was the result of detailed information gathering and analysis conducted by General Yasuji Okamura, who decreed that villages suspected of harboring or abetting the Chinese communist forces were to be completely destroyed as part of creating a buffer no-man's land around areas controlled by Japanese forces. In these "no-man's lands," nothing living, and no available shelters, should exist. 

As part of the strategy, the Japanese deliberately attacked and massacred the village on the Chinese New Year's Day of 1941.

References 

Japanese war crimes
Second Sino-Japanese War crimes
1941 in Japan
Mass murder in 1941
1941 in China
Massacres in 1941
Massacres in China
History of Hebei
January 1941 events
1941 crimes in China
1941 murders in China